Dabeiba is a town and municipality in the Colombian department of Antioquia. The Battle of Dabeiba took place there in October 2000.

Climate
Dabeiba has a tropical rainforest climate (Af) with heavy rainfall year-round.

References

Municipalities of Antioquia Department